Here's Dawn is an Australian television series which aired 1964 to 1965 on the Nine Network. A half-hour variety series with emphasis on comedy sketches, it was produced in Sydney and starred Dawn Lake. While popular with viewers, it was not well received by critics. Nevertheless, along with The Mavis Bramston Show and Barley Charlie, it represented an increasing interest by Australian TV stations towards locally produced comedy programming, which had previously been largely neglected.

See also
Take That - First Australian sitcom (1957-1959)
The Passionate Pianist - 1957 TV comedy short

References

External links
''Here's Dawn on IMDb

1964 Australian television series debuts
1965 Australian television series endings
Black-and-white Australian television shows
English-language television shows
Nine Network original programming
Australian television sketch shows